Viscum combreticola, the Combretum mistletoe, is a leafless, dioecious mistletoe shrub, occurring from southern to tropical Africa, in a broad zone following the Rift Valleys. Though it is typically a hemiparasite of Combretum species, it may also be found on Terminalia (Combretaceae), Acacia, Croton, Diplorhynchus, Dombeya, Heteropyxis, Maytenus, Melia, Strychnos or Vangueria.  

The much-branched twigs are flattened, ribbed and divided into clear segments. The brittle olive to olive-green segments exude a watery sap when broken. Their sessile fruit, usually in pairs, grow from the segment joints. They are ellipsoid berries of 6-7 mm in diameter, that are warty when young but smooth and orange when ripe.

The species is vegetatively similar to V. anceps and artificially resembles the Asian species V. dichotomum. Male inflorescences and fruit are required to separate it from V. shirense and V. cylindricum.

References

External links
 Viscum diversity in southern Africa, iziko museums

combreticola
Parasitic plants
Flora of South Africa
Dioecious plants